Piiukaarelaid (alternatively: Piiukaare laid and Piiulaid) is a small, uninhabited islet in the Baltic Sea belonging to the country of Estonia. Piiukaarelaid has an approximate area of 8.5 hectares and a circumference of 1.8 kilometers  and is administered by the village of Mereäärse, Varbla Parish, Pärnu County. The islet is fully protected as part of the Varbla Islets Landscape reserve (Estonian: Varbla laidude maastikukaitseala), and is an important breeding site for 54 species of birds, including: the velvet scoter, the little tern, the red-backed shrike, the curlew, the common tern, the Arctic tern, the redshank, the northern shoveler, the gadwall, the black-tailed godwit, the Greylag goose the tufted duck, the mute swan, the common gull, the goosander, the common eider, the lapwing, and others.

References

Estonian islands in the Baltic
Lääneranna Parish
Uninhabited islands of Estonia